Priscilla Wright (born August 14, 1940 in London, Ontario) is a Canadian singer, most famous for the song "The Man in the Raincoat", which she first released in 1955, and re-recorded in 1988.

Biography
Wright's father was choir conductor and composer Don Wright, and her maternal grandfather was Canadian Prime Minister Arthur Meighen.

Wright had a hit in the United States at the age of 14 with the song "The Man in the Raincoat" in 1955. It sold over half a million copies in the U.S. and hit No. 16 on Billboards chart of "Most Played by Jockeys". Following this she spent 14 years singing with the Ontario group Moxie Whitney, and sang with The National Press and Allied Jazz.

In 1991, she signed to Attic Records after a hiatus and released the album When You Love Somebody. In 1993 she was nominated for a Juno Award for Most Promising Artist.

Discography

Albums

Singles

References

1940 births
Living people
Canadian women country singers
Canadian country singer-songwriters
Musicians from London, Ontario
20th-century Canadian women singers